The  is a replica of a J. G. Brill Company two-car deluxe coach operated as an excursion train by Kyushu Railway Company (JR Kyushu) in Japan since August 2015.

Overview
Details of the planned excursion train, provisionally called the "Sweets Train", were first announced in January 2014.
The train entered service on 8 August 2015. 

The name "Sweets Train" derives from the sweets served on board.  They are designed and created in a Japanese-French style by Chef Yoshihiro Narisawa, who owns an eponymous restaurant (NARISAWA) in Tokyo.

Design

The train is formed of two modified former KiHa 47 diesel cars, renumbered KiRoShi 47 9176 (car 1) and KiRoShi 47 3505 (car 2), and is intended to replicate the design and ambience of the luxury Brill coaches purchased by the Kyushu Railway in 1908. The purchase occurred just before the company was nationalized under the Railway Nationalization Act) and the cars were never put into service.

The rebuilding project was overseen by industrial designer Eiji Mitooka, using scale models of the original coaches built by the railway modeller Nobutaro Hara.

Operations

The train runs a daily round trip from Sasebo to Nagasaki between July of one year to March of the following year, mostly on weekends.

Individual car details

Car 1 (KiRoShi 47 9176)
This car was formerly numbered KiHa 47 176, and was previously operated by JR Shikoku until it was withdrawn from service on 30 April 2011. Rebuilding work was carried out at JR Kyushu's Kokura General Rolling Stock Centre, and included removal of the original toilet.

Car 2 (KiRoShi 47 3505)
This car was formerly numbered KiHa 47 1505, and was previously operated by JR Shikoku until it was withdrawn from service on 30 April 2011. Rebuilding work was carried out at JR Kyushu's Kokura General Rolling Stock Centre, and included addition of a new toilet.

See also
 List of named passenger trains of Japan
 Joyful Train, the generic name for excursion and charter trains in Japan

References

External links 

 

Kyushu Railway Company
Named passenger trains of Japan
Railway services introduced in 2015
2015 establishments in Japan
J. G. Brill Company